Lakadiya or Lakadia is a village in Bhachau Taluka of Kutch district in Gujarat, India.

References

Villages in Kutch district
1578 establishments in India